Cedric Tillman (born April 22, 1970) is a former American football wide receiver who played eight seasons in the Arena Football League with the Denver Dynamite and Arizona Rattlers. He played college football at Northern Colorado University. Tillman was named Second Team All-Arena in 1994. He was a member of the  Arizona Rattlers teams that won ArenaBowl VIII and ArenaBowl XI.

External links
Just Sports Stats

Living people
1970 births
Players of American football from Colorado
American football wide receivers
American football defensive backs
African-American players of American football
Northern Colorado Bears football players
Denver Dynamite (arena football) players
Arizona Rattlers players
Sportspeople from Pueblo, Colorado
21st-century African-American sportspeople
20th-century African-American sportspeople